Julie Tristan is an American Radio & Television personality from St. Louis, Missouri.

Career
Tristan is the host of The Wake Up with Bret & Julie on Y98. She is also the afternoon on-air talent on 102.5 KEZK. She's also an MMJ Reporter, Anchor and Producer for HEC Media's "Spotlight STL" airing on KPLR 11 Sundays at 9:30am.  She also makes time to run her production company 8 Dogs Video where she is a freelance videographer/editor/host www.8DogsVideo.com. Previously Tristan did middays 10am-2pm on Y98 and was the interim night DJ on Y98 from 7pm-Midnight. Tristan hosted "Billy & Julie in the Morning" on 103.3 KLOU. She was also the host of "Show Me St. Louis" at KSDK-TV, the NBC affiliate in St. Louis, Missouri. She is also a radio host on the weekends for WARH 106.5 The Arch. Tristan previously was a reporter & weekend anchor at KOMU-TV, the NBC affiliate in Columbia, Missouri. Tristan, a St. Louis native, also worked at Clear Channel Radio-Total Traffic as a traffic reporter and voice-over talent for Oldies 103.3 KLOU-FM, KMJM-FM Magic 104.9 & KATZ-AM Gospel 1600. She then was the executive producer and co-host for the nationally syndicated Steve and DC Morning Show. She has also been an on-air talent for WVRV-FM 101.1 The River (Bonneville Radio).

Awards
Julie Tristan has won 3 Mid-America Emmy Awards
-In 2022 Tristan was nominated for 3 Mid-America Emmy Awards , 2 in the "Magazine Program" category for "Spotlight STL" from HEC Media & 1 for "Societal Concerns-Short Form Content" for her MMJ story about the “Second Chance Ranch”.

-In 2021 Tristan won 1 Mid-America Emmy Awards in the "Magazine Program" category for being a producer/host/MMJ for "Spotlight STL" with HEC Media. 

-In 2020 Tristan won 2 Mid-America Emmy Awards , 1 in the "Magazine Program" category for "Spotlight STL" and 1 in "Public/Current/Community Affairs" for her MMJ story about "The Onion House" with HEC Media

In 2012 Tristan was nominated for a Mid-America Emmy Awards in the “On-Camera Talent: Performer/Host” category.

-Audacy STL Star of the Quarter for excellence in creativity, community & communication

-”Best Social Integration” iHeartRadio Influencers Awards

-"Philanthropist Of The Year", Gateway Pet Guardians Animal Rescue

-“Spirit of Hope Award”, along with co-workers American Cancer Society

-$50,000 Grant winner, Petco

-iHeartMedia Leader in the Workplace

-KSDK-TV “Star of the Week”

Education
Tristan grew up in Creve Coeur and attended Pattonville High School. After realized she "didn’t want to study to be a surgeon at SLU after I took biology and had to dissect a frog; she earned her Bachelor of Journalism degree from University of Missouri.

References

External links
 Official website
 KSDK Show Me St. Louis
 Julie Tristan on OpenBeast
 Radio Traffic Reporter
 Julie Tristan New Host of Show Me St. Louis
 Cooking On Show Me St. Louis
 Show Me St. Louis Spotlights Phillips & Company

Living people
University of Missouri alumni
American television news anchors
People from St. Louis
American women television journalists
Year of birth missing (living people)
21st-century American women